Moemi Ishibuchi (born 20 April 1996) is a Japanese professional footballer who plays as a forward for WE League club Albirex Niigata.

Club career 
Ishibuchi made her WE League debut on 20 September 2021.

References 

WE League players
Living people
1996 births
Japanese women's footballers
Women's association football forwards
Albirex Niigata Ladies players
Association football people from Aichi Prefecture